637: Always and Forever is Crystal Kay's second album. It is her first R&B record; After the release of her debut album C.L.L Crystal Lover Light, Crystal started to move towards her new sound and made the transition with the single "Girl's Night". The album 637 features songs produced by well-known Japanese urban musicians Verbal, T-Kura, and Michico.

The album reached #19 on the weekly Oricon chart, and continued to rank for eight weeks. In all selling a total of 48,550 copies.

Track listing

Charts

Release history

References

External links 
 

2001 albums
Crystal Kay albums
Epic Records albums